Dorcus parallelus, the antelope beetle, is a species of beetles in the family Lucanidae. It was described by Say in 1824. Adult species feed on dead or rotten wood, while larvae feed on decaying stumps and logs. The larvae prefers elms, but can also feed on other trees.

References

Lucaninae
Beetles of North America
Beetles described in 1824
Taxa named by Thomas Say